Brian Current is a Canadian composer. He won the Juno Award for Classical Composition of the Year in 2015 for the opera Airline Icarus.

References

External links
Official website

Living people
Juno Award for Classical Composition of the Year winners
Jules Léger Prize for New Chamber Music winners
Canadian classical composers
Year of birth missing (living people)